Plum Bistro is a Black-owned restaurant in Seattle, in the U.S. state of Washington. The business is Makini Howell's flagship restaurant.

Reception 
BuzzFeed named Plum Bistro one of 24 "bucket list" vegan restaurants in 2015. Modern Farmer named the business one of the 15 best vegan restaurants in the country in 2018. Aimee Rizzo included the restaurant in The Infatuation's 2020 overview of "The Best Mac & Cheese In Seattle", as well as a 2022 list of "The Best Restaurants For Vegan Food In Seattle". Seattle Metropolitan included Plum Bistro in a 2022 list of the city's 100 best restaurants. Shape named Plum Bistro one of the top 10 upscale vegan restaurants in the United States.

See also 

 List of Black-owned restaurants
 List of vegetarian restaurants

References

External links
 
 

Black-owned restaurants in the United States
Restaurants in Seattle
Vegan restaurants in Washington (state)